William Washington Serini (March 11, 1922 – June 21, 1994) was a guard in the National Football League. He played four seasons with the Chicago Bears before playing his final season with the Green Bay Packers.

References 

1922 births
1994 deaths
Players of American football from New York (state)
Chicago Bears players
Green Bay Packers players
American football offensive guards
Kentucky Wildcats football players